Coreura fida is a moth of the subfamily Arctiinae. It was described by Jacob Hübner in 1827. It is found in Mexico and Brazil.

References

Euchromiina
Moths described in 1827